The Kelly Hills are a mountain range at the southern end of the Northern Territory of Australia. The area is known as Aputjilpinya in the native Yankunytjatjara language. It forms part of an important Mala Dreaming track that runs between Uluṟu and Ulkiya.

There are a few soakages located within the hills. One of them, Puntitjara, was recorded by several early White explorers travelling through the Kelly Hills. The South Australian government's North-West Prospecting Expedition, led by Lawrence Wells, was brought there by an Aboriginal guide in 1903; one of the expedition's prospectors, Herbert Basedow, recorded the name as "Punndijarrinna" and reported that it was a good source of water. Basedow returned to Puntitjara in June 1926 on another expedition, this one led by Donald Mackay. According to Mackay, they found it dry and covered with a layer of sand. The anthropologist Ted Strehlow visited Puntitjara in August 1936, but founded it covered by mud.

References

Mountain ranges of the Northern Territory